Copenhagen Bombay is a Danish production company, animation studio and distribution company, specializing in entertainment for children and teenagers. It produces films, television, books, games, online universes and other media.

History
The company was founded in 2006 by director Anders Morgenthaler and producer Sarita Christensen. Christensen came from a position in Zentropa where she had produced  Morgenthaler's film Princess.

Notable productions
Esben Toft Jacobsen's animated feature The Great Bear was selected for the Generation Kplus programme at the 2011 Berlin International Film Festival, where it attracted considerable international attention and was sold to a wide range of countries. The documentary The Testament won a Bodil Award for Best Danish Documentary at the 65th Bodil Awards.

Filmography

Production
 Vesterbro (2007)
 Eat Shit and Die (2008)
 Carsten & Gittes filmballade (2008)
 De vilde hjerter (2008)
 Æblet & ormen (2009)
 Fup & Svindel (2009)
 Hvad vil du vide? (2010)
 Tigre og tatoveringer (2010)
 Hjemve (2011)
 Pandaerne (2011)
 The Great Bear (2011)
 Restaurangutang (2011)
 Testamentet (2011)

Distribution
 Æblet & ormen (2009)
 Tigre og tatoveringer (2010)

References

External links
 Copenhagen Bombay at IMDb
 

Danish animation studios
Film production companies of Denmark
Mass media companies of Denmark
Mass media companies based in Copenhagen
Mass media companies established in 2006
Danish companies established in 2006
Bodil Special Award recipients
Companies based in Copenhagen Municipality